Ruby R. Levitt (September 12, 1907 – January 18, 1992) was an American set decorator. She was nominated for four Academy Awards in the category Best Art Direction.

Selected filmography
Levitt was nominated for four Academy Awards for Best Art Direction:
 Pillow Talk (1959)
 The Sound of Music (1965)
 The Andromeda Strain (1971)
 Chinatown (1974)

References

External links

1907 births
1992 deaths
American set decorators